The Rivers State Waste Management Agency (RIWAMA) is a government of Rivers State body responsible for the enhancement of the environment with the aim of achieving positive and substantial change in living conditions as well as reducing diseases or health problems in the state. It was created in 2013 by the Rivers State House of Assembly and was assented by the state governor in July 2014. Prior to this, the agency had functioned as "Rivers State Environmental Sanitation Authority (RSESA)" which originally was formed in 1983 to tackle municipal waste and other related issues.

See also
List of government agencies of Rivers State
Rivers State Ministry of Environment

References

External links

Waste Management Agency
Environment of Rivers State
2013 establishments in Nigeria
2010s establishments in Rivers State
Waste organizations
Environmental agencies of country subdivisions
Waste management in Nigeria